Henry Greville may refer to:

 Henry Greville, 3rd Earl of Warwick (1779–1853), British politician
 Henry Gréville (1842–1902), French writer
 Henry William Greville (1801–1872), English diarist
 Henry Francis Greville (1760–1816), British impresario